The wXw Unified World Wrestling Championship is a professional wrestling world heavyweight championship, contested in the German professional wrestling promotion, Westside Xtreme Wrestling. The championship was established in 2001 as the wXw World Heavyweight Championship, but was later unified with the wXw World Lightweight Championship to create the modern title.

Title history 
There have been a total of 50 reigns shared between 34 different champions. Mad Cow was the inaugural champion. Big van Walter, John Klinger and Jurn Simmons shares the record for most reign with three. Ares's second reign is the longest at 603 days, while Alex Shelley, Jimmy Jacobs and Marty Scurll reign is the shortest at less than hour. The current champion is Levaniel who is in his first reign.

Combined reigns  

See also
wXw World Tag Team Championship
wXw Shotgun Championship

References

External links
Official website 
Current Champions
Westside Xtreme Wrestling at Online World of Wrestling
Title history at Wrestling-Titles.com
wXw Unified World Wrestling Championship

Westside Xtreme Wrestling championships
World heavyweight wrestling championships
World professional wrestling championships